Steve Bever is an American baseball coach and player, who was the head coach at Pittsburg State University from 1991 to 2012. Bever was the second coach in program history after the university restarted it after a 17 year break. Bever played for the Gorillas from 1966 to 1969.

Career

Collegiate career 
In February 1990, Bever was hired as Pittsburg State University's second head baseball coach in school history after a 17-year break due to budget cuts. When Bever was hired, Pittsburg State had finished transitioning into the NCAA Division II and its new conference, the Mid-America Intercollegiate Athletics Association. During his 22 years after rebuilding the program, Bever led the Gorillas to two MIAA championships, four NCAA Tournament appearances, and led the program to a 30+ win season just four years after it restarted.

Post-collegiate career 
Four years after retirement in 2016, Bever returned to coaching, but at the high school level. He is the current head coach at his alma mater, Girard High School.

Head coach record

References

External links 
 Pittsburg State profile (archived)

Living people
Baseball coaches from Kansas
Pittsburg State Gorillas baseball players
Pittsburg State Gorillas baseball coaches
People from Crawford County, Kansas
Year of birth missing (living people)